Abu Hakfah al-Janubi (also spelled Abo Hakfa) is a village in northern Syria located east of Homs in the Homs Governorate. According to the Syria Central Bureau of Statistics, Abu Hakfah al-Janubi had a population of 1,036 in the 2004 census. Its inhabitants are predominantly Alawites.

References

Populated places in al-Mukharram District
Alawite communities in Syria